Wolfgang Feiersinger (born 30 January 1965) is an Austrian former professional footballer who played as a defender.

Club career
Feiersinger started his professional career in 1986 with Austria Salzburg and stayed with them for ten years, winning two league titles during the club's most successful period. In 1994, he played with them in the UEFA Cup final against Inter Milan. During the 1996–97 season he joined German side Borussia Dortmund and immediately won the Champions League with them, playing both legs of the semi-final against Manchester United but missing out on the Final squad altogether because Matthias Sammer returned from injury to claim his place. Feiersinger also won the Intercontinental Cup with Dortmund later that year.

In 2000, he returned to Austria and signed for LASK Linz only to move to back to Salzburg after only one season in Linz. After one other season with Austria he finished his career with lower league PSV SW Salzburg.

International career
Feiersinger made his debut for Austria in an August 1990 friendly match against Switzerland and went on to earn 46 caps, scoring no goals. His last international was an April 1999 European Championship qualification match against San Marino. Feiersinger was a member of the Austrian team at the 1998 FIFA World Cup, he played in all three matches. Also, he played in 15 World Cup qualification games.

Personal life
Feiersinger's daughter Laura Feiersinger is a professional football player as well. She plays for FFC Frankfurt and the Austria women's national football team.

Honours
Austria Salzburg
 Austrian Bundesliga: 1993–94, 1994–95
 Austrian Supercup: 1994, 1995

Borussia Dortmund
 UEFA Champions League: 1996–97
 Intercontinental Cup: 1997

References

External links
 
 

1965 births
Living people
People from Saalfelden
Footballers from Salzburg (state)
Austrian footballers
Association football defenders
Austria international footballers
1998 FIFA World Cup players
Austrian Football Bundesliga players
Bundesliga players
FC Red Bull Salzburg players
Borussia Dortmund players
LASK players
Austrian expatriate footballers
Austrian expatriate sportspeople in Germany
Expatriate footballers in Germany